Donatien de Bruyne (1871–1935) was a French biblical scholar, textual critic, and Benedictine.

He was born on 7 October 1871 in Neuf-Église, ordained in 1895. De Bruyne examined Latin manuscripts of the Vulgate, and he collated some of the manuscripts (e.g. Codex Frisingensis, Codex Carinthianus).

De Bruyne questioned Jerome's authorship of the Pauline epistles of Vulgate. According to him Pelagius prepared the Pauline epistles.

De Bruyne discovered and published in 1930 an anti-Marcionist Prologue to the Gospel of John.

Works 
 Une Concordance Biblique d’Origine Pélagiense Revue Biblique 5 (1908), pp. 75–83.
 Sommaires, divisions et rubriques de la Bible latine (Namur, 1914).
 Étude sur les origines de notre texte latin de saint Paul, Revue Biblique 12 (1915), pp. 358–392.
 Préfaces de la Bible latine (Namur, 1920)
 Les fragments de Freising (épîtres de S. Paul et épîtres catholiques), Rome, Bibliothèque Vaticane, 1921.
 Les plus anciens prologues latins des Évangiles, Revue benedictine 40 (1928).
 Nouveaux Sermons de Saint Pierre Chrysologue, Journal of Theological Studies 29 (1928), pp. 362–368.

1871 births
1935 deaths
French biblical scholars
20th-century French Catholic theologians
French Benedictines
Benedictine theologians